2007 in men's road cycling is about the 2007 men's bicycle races governed by the UCI.

News

January 
1 – Gordon McCauley wins the first race of 2007, which is the first stage of the 2007 Tour de Vineyards. He finishes in front of a leading group existing of three riders with the others being Clinton Robert Avery and Heath Blackgrove. nzherald.co.nz
1 – Shane Vasquez of Belize wins KREM New Years' Day Cycling Classic 2007 in his home country. dewielersite.net
2 – Ivan Basso receives the 40th Premio Sport Award, which is awarded by Enrico Morelli. Other nominees were Alfredo Martini, Franco Ballerini, Alessandro Petacchi, Francesco Chicchi, Michele Bartoli and Andrea Tafi. cyclingnews.com
2 – With his win in the second stage of the 2007 Tour de Vineyards Gordon McCauley wins his second consecutive race of 2007 and remains the only rider to win a professional road cycling race for the year. dunnersdan.com
3 – Due to troubles in organizing the 2007 ENECO Tour the race through the Netherlands and Belgium might be cancelled later in the season as directors Rob Discart and Henk van Mulukom are fighting about the planned sacking of Van Mulukom. shimano-benelux.nl
4 – Heath Blackgrove wins two stages in a row to claim the overall win in the 2007 Tour de Vineyards. sportzhub.com
6 – Brazilian Nilceu Santos wins the Copa América de Ciclismo in his home country. dewielersite.net
7 – Walter Bénéteau ends his career after seven years of professional cycling, finishing his career with a total of three wins. dewielersite.net
9 – Italian riders Nicolas Loda and Marco Milesi both end their career. cyclingpost.com
10 – Rabobank announces to remain the team's main sponsor until at least 2012. rabobank.com
12 – Nathan O'Neill clinches the Australian time trial championship title by finishing one minute and eleven seconds in front of second placed Rory Sutherland. theaustralian.news.com.au
11 – Unless signing doping accused Ivan Basso the team of Discovery Channel Pro Cycling Team remains part of the Pro Tour. They were risking to be rejected for the 2007 season. usatoday.com
12 – Pro Tour team Unibet.com Cycling Team is rejected to participate in Paris–Nice by the organisers. Instead of them continental team Agritubel is selected. The organisation behind the race is known to have troubles with the UCI and their Pro Tour system. cyclingpost.com
14 – Darren Lapthorne becomes Australian national road race champion after he finished 15 seconds ahead of a group riders led by Robert McLachlan. cyclingpost.com
15 – Former world champion Mario Cipollini will be taken to court or has to pay 1.5 million Euro's in a pending fraud case. dewielersite.net
18 – Le Monde reports that Óscar Pereiro, second in the Tour de France 2006 behind doping affected Floyd Landis also tested positive during the Tour. The substance found in his body, salbutamol is commonly used to cure asthma, and is allowed to be used in cycle racing if the cyclist can provide a medical prescription for the substance. It is alleged that the Union Cycliste Internationale gave Pereiro retroactive permission to use the substance on medical grounds after the positive tests. The French anti-doping agency questions the veracity of the medical grounds. dewielersite.net
19 – Baden Cooke wins the third stage in the 2007 Tour Down Under and celebrates the first victory of the Unibet.com Cycling Team as a member of the Pro Tour. cyclingpost.com
19 – Óscar Pereiro claims he is innocent and claims his use of salbutamol was legal. He said he has sent the correct documentation to the French doping agency to prove his words. dewielersite.net
19 – In the Cofidis doping case from 2004 seven people face punishments to a maximum of one year detention. Cyclists David Millar and Massimiliano Lelli were not punished. guardian.co.uk
23 – Johan Museeuw reveals that he has used doping during the last years of his career. Patrick Lefevere is blamed to be stimulating cyclists to use doping. The UCI announces that the last speculations against Óscar Pereiro were based on nothing. According to the UCI Pereiro did not use doping.
26 – Patrick Lefevere strikes back and takes the newspaper Het Laatste Nieuws to court after their recent doping stories about the Quick Step-Innergetic manager. hln.be
26 – The 2011 road cycling world championships will be held in Copenhagen according to a UCI official in Hooglede, Belgium. telesport.nl
27 – The 2007 Tour of Murcia originally scheduled from 7 to 11 March is cancelled and will not take place in 2007. telesport.nl
29 – Tony Houbrechts a former helper of Felice Gimondi is arrested and set to jail as he is suspected to have set up a drugs laboratorium. telesport.nl

Pro Tour

Continental Tours

UCI Africa Tour

UCI America Tour

UCI Asia Tour

UCI Europe Tour

UCI Oceania Tour

USA Cycling Professional Tour

Other multiple stage road races

Other single day road races

Other single day time trials

National championships

See also
 2007 in women's road cycling
 2007 in track cycling

 
Men's road cycling by year